Irgoli is a comune (municipality) in the Province of Nuoro in the Italian region Sardinia, located about  northeast of Cagliari and about  northeast of Nuoro.

Irgoli borders the following municipalities: Galtellì, Loculi, Lula, Onifai, Siniscola.

References

Sources

Cities and towns in Sardinia